Hynek Bočan (Born 29 April 1938) is a Czech film director and screenwriter. He started his studies at Film and TV School of the Academy of Performing Arts in Prague when he was 18 years old.

He started as an assistant director on movies Ninety Degrees in the Shade, Diamonds of the Night or Ikarie XB-1. His first movie was an adaptation of Milan Kundera's story Nobody Gets the Last Laugh in 1965. His movie Pasťák (1968) was banned and only released in 1990

Selected filmography
 Hatered (1960) - short film
 Nobody Gets the Last Laugh (1965) - Won Grand Prix at International Filmfestival Mannheim-Heidelberg
 Honour and Glory (1967)
 Private Gale (1967) - Won Passinetti prize at Venice Film Festival
 The Borstal (1968) - Released in 1990
 Záhada hlavolamu (1969) TV series
 Svatební cesta do Jiljí (1983) 
 Give the Devil His Due'' (1985)

References

External links
 

1938 births
Czech film directors
Czech screenwriters
Male screenwriters
Living people
Film directors from Prague